Christ and the Woman of Samaria is a 1637 painting by the Italian artist Artemisia Gentileschi, depicting a story from the New Testament. It is part of a private collection in Palermo.

Subject Matter
The story of the Samaritan woman is told in the Gospel of John. A woman leans eagerly forward in conversation with Jesus, in contrast to the typical portrayal of the time which showed the woman sitting passively listening to a monologue. It is one of the few works by Gentileschi with a full landscape. The disciples of Jesus can be seen in the background, walking out of the walled city. The vibrant colors of the figures' clothes and the detailed landscape became associated with the work she produced during this period in Naples.

Provenance
Correspondence from Gentileschi indicates that she was trying to sell two paintings to Cardinal Francesco Barberini in 1637, one of which was a "Woman of Samaria". This work was recently discovered in a private collection and identified at that painting. The work apparently never reached Barberini and its history is otherwise undocumented.

References

Sources

1630 paintings
Paintings by Artemisia Gentileschi